John Edgar McCafferty (January 6, 1920 – April 30, 1980) was a Bishop of the Catholic Church in the United States. He served as an auxiliary bishop of the Diocese of Rochester from 1968 to 1980.

Biography
Born in New York City, John McCafferty was ordained a priest for the Diocese of Rochester on March 17, 1945.

On January 5, 1968 Pope Paul VI appointed him as the Titular Bishop of Tanudaia and Auxiliary Bishop of Rochester.  He was consecrated bishop by Archbishop Luigi Raimondi, the Apostolic Delegate to the United States, on June 14, 1968. The principal co-consecrators were Rochester Bishop Fulton J. Sheen and Bishop Emeritus James E. Kearney.

McCafferty served as an auxiliary bishop until his death on April 30, 1980, at the age of 60.

References

1920 births
1980 deaths
Clergy from New York City
Roman Catholic Diocese of Rochester
20th-century American Roman Catholic titular bishops